Tureholm Castle is a privately owned castle in Trosa Municipality in Sweden. The castle was built in the 18th century, and is a listed building since 1987.

History

Tureholm is situated on the location of the original castle that belonged to the nobleman Nils Gädda in the 1300s, and hence received its first name, Gäddeholm. In the 1640s, a new castle was built by Erik Dahlberg, commissioned by Sten Nilsson Bielke. The castle burned down during the Russian fires in 1719. Ten years after the Russian fires, Thure Gabriel Bielke began to build the castle again and since then it has looked like it does today, it is also after him that the castle has been named Tureholm.

In Suecia Antiqua et Hodierna, one can see the castle that burned down and conclude that the castle we see today is quite similar to what was before, but without a similarly well-maintained park.
The castle came by marriage between Svante Nilsson's (Sture) grandson's daughter Sigrid and Thure Pedersson Bielke (1562) to attend the Bielke family, which then held it until 1916. Since 1935, the castle is owned by the Bonde family and is a private home.

Today
 
There is a large library and family portrait in the castle. A large collection of weapons from the late 16th century, together with much of the furniture, has however been sold from the castle.

See also
List of castles in Sweden
Suecia Antiqua et Hodierna
 

 
Castles in Södermanland County